Herbert McNaspy (September 16, 1886 – April 26, 1913) was an American college football coach. He served as the head football coach at the University of Louisiana at Lafayette (then known as Southwestern Louisiana Industrial Institute) in 1906. He was the brother of fellow Ragin' Cajun head coach Clement J. McNaspy.

Head coaching record

References

1886 births
1913 deaths
Louisiana Ragin' Cajuns football coaches
Sportspeople from Kansas